Hong Kong language can refer to
 Languages of Hong Kong, the wide variety of languages used by different communities and racial groups in Hong Kong.
 Hong Kong Cantonese, the form of Cantonese spoken in Hong Kong, which is often known as the Hong Kong speech.